Mark Deklin (born December 3, 1967) is an American actor and fight coordinator. He starred in the Fox primetime drama Lone Star, the ABC comedy-drama GCB, the Lifetime comedy-drama Devious Maids, and in 2017 joined the ABC political drama Designated Survivor as Senator Jack Bowman. He voiced Deimos in the video game God of War: Ghost of Sparta. He also was the voice of Warden in the video game Tom Clancy's Rainbow Six Siege.

Early life and education
Deklin was born on December 3, 1967 in Pittsburgh, Pennsylvania. He graduated from Thomas Jefferson High School in 1986. He holds a B.A. in English and History from the Pennsylvania State University, an M.F.A. in acting from the University of Washington in Seattle, and is a certified member of the Society of American Fight Directors.

Career
A classically-trained stage actor, Deklin has worked extensively on Broadway and off-Broadway. On television, he has had recurring roles as Dr. Matthew Shaw in the Fox series Justice from 2006 to 2007, as Elliott Mayer in the CBS sitcom The Ex List in 2008, as Stan Edwards in the CBS drama Hawaii Five-O from 2011 to 2012, as Joe Nazario in the NBC police drama Shades of Blue in 2015, as Agent Cameron Davies in the TNT series Rizzoli & Isles in 2016, as Dr. William Landon in the TNT procedural Major Crimes in 2017, and as Roy in the Netflix comedy Grace and Frankie from 2018 to 2019. He has also had voice roles in several video games, including Call of Duty 3, Metal Gear Solid: Peace Walker, God of War: Ghost of Sparta, and Halo Wars 2, and co-starred in the films Riverworld, Tarzan, The Wish List, Tides of War, The Wedding Chapel, Never Say Macbeth, Switched for Christmas, The Answer, and Mini's First Time.

Deklin starred in the Fox primetime drama Lone Star as Trammell Thatcher, the ABC soapy comedy GCB as Blake Reilly, and the Lifetime comedy-drama Devious Maids as Nicholas Deering. He has also had a number of guest-starring roles in television series, including Sex and the City, Charmed, Frasier, CSI: Crime Scene Investigation, Desperate Housewives, Nip/Tuck, Two and a Half Men, Life on Mars, The Mentalist, Warehouse 13, Hot in Cleveland, Big Love, Major Crimes, Castle, Criminal Minds, and The Blacklist.

Filmography

Video games

References

External links
 
 
 
 

1967 births
Living people
20th-century American male actors
21st-century American male actors
Action choreographers
American male film actors
American male stage actors
American male television actors
Male actors from Pittsburgh
Pennsylvania State University alumni
University of Washington School of Drama alumni